Trude Klecker (born 7 February 1926) is an Austrian alpine skier and world champion. She is from Semmering and later lived in Trieste in Italy. Klecker received a gold medal at the 1954 World Championships in Åre, winning the slalom event, and a silver medal in the downhill.

References

External links
Trude Klecker's profile at Sports Reference.com

1926 births
Living people
Austrian female alpine skiers
Olympic alpine skiers of Austria
Alpine skiers at the 1952 Winter Olympics
Alpine skiers at the 1956 Winter Olympics
20th-century Austrian women
21st-century Austrian women